William Robb Cockburn (3 May 1937 – August 1995) was an English professional footballer. After a five-year stint at Burnley without ever playing for the first team, he joined Gillingham in 1960 and went on to make 62 appearances in the Football League before dropping out of the professional game.

References

1937 births
1995 deaths
People from Peterlee
Footballers from County Durham
English footballers
Association football defenders
Gillingham F.C. players
Burnley F.C. players
English Football League players
Bill